The Valea Buciumanilor is a left tributary of the river Abrud in Romania. It flows into the Abrud in Bucium-Sat.

References

Rivers of Romania
Rivers of Alba County